Chris Mack may refer to:

 Chris Mack (basketball) (born 1969), American college basketball coach
 Chris Mack (cricketer) (born 1970), Australian cricketer
 Chris Mack (scientist) (born 1960), American scientist

See also
Mack (surname)